Events from the year 1193 in Ireland.

Incumbent
Lord: John

Events
Founding of Grey Abbey in County Down by Affreca de Courcy.
Inishcloghbran is plundered by the sons of Jocelyn de Angulo and of Conchobar Maenmaige Ua Conchobair.
King John (the then Prince of Moreton) gave the Crumlin church to form one prebend in the collegiate church of Saint Patrick.

Deaths
Derbforgaill, noblewoman (born 1108).
Gilla Críst Ua Mucaráin, Bishop of Louth.

References